Sonja Richter (born 4 January 1974) is a Danish actress. She is best known for her performance in the 2002 film Open Hearts by Susanne Bier, for which she was nominated for both the Bodil Award and the Robert Award.

In a career which has so far focused on films in her native Denmark, she has starred in Stealing Rembrandt (2003) and Villa Paranoia (2004), along with several other films and a significant amount of work in television. In 2004, at the 54th Berlin International Film Festival, Richter was one of ten young European actors that were presented the Shooting Stars Award by the European Film Promotion. In 2007, she received the Crown Prince Couple's Culture Prize.

Personal life 
Richter studied acting at Odense Theatre's Acting School, graduating in 1999.

Selected filmography

Awards and nominations

References

External links

1974 births
Danish film actresses
Danish television actresses
Living people
People from Esbjerg
Recipients of the Crown Prince Couple's Culture Prize
21st-century Danish actresses